Indischer Brunnen is a fountain at Luisenstädtischer Kanal in Kreuzberg, Berlin, Germany.

References

External links

 

Fountains in Germany
Friedrichshain-Kreuzberg
Outdoor sculptures in Berlin